Nauru competed at the 2015 Pacific Games in Port Moresby, Papua New Guinea from 4 to 18 July 2015. Nauru listed 130 competitors as of 4 July 2015.

Athletics

Nauru qualified 11 athletes in track and field:

Men
 JJ Capelle
 Joseph Soriano Dabana
 Dysard Dageago
 Christopher Esela
 German Grundler
 Joshua Jeremiah
 Olimac Scotty
 John-Rico Togagae

Women
 Lovelite Detenamo
 Chanana Jeremiah
 Jerusha Eibon Mau

Parasport
Men
 Jaeko Ageidu

Basketball

Nauru qualified  men's and women's teams in basketball (26 athletes):

Men
 Kingson Akibwib
 Richart Daoe
 Terry Deidenang
 Marcus-Paul Detenamo
 Martin-Crowe Detenamo
 Royce Dick
 Niga Haulangi
 Johnson Hiram
 Jencke Jeremiah
 Joeson Kanimea
 Gavrick Mwareow
 Kaairo Tiaon
 David Mick Vorbach

Women
 Kerina Adam
 Julinda Cain
 Jeiziannie Deraudag
 Evalyn Detenamo
 Micheala Detenamo
 Jeizianna Halstead
 Tromina Hartman
 Janet Hubert
 April Ika
 Shania Ika
 Sigrid Jeremiah
 Elamita Kamtaura
 Zephrina Scotty

Boxing

Nauru qualified 9 athletes in boxing:

Men
 Roteiga Adeang
 Colan Caleb
 Alphonse Deireragea
 Mel Lachlan Halstead
 Dunstall Harris
 Teroi Ketner
 Blanco Wharton
 Dexan Martin

Women
 Rachelle Bonillo

Powerlifting

Nauru qualified 15 athletes in powerlifting:

Men
 Deamo Baguga
 Roy Detabene
 Starron Slade Dowabobo
 Taggart Duburiya
 Robert Kun
 Sonsy Matisima
 Raboe Roland
 John Tsiode
 Jezza Uepa

Women
 Delwi Agigo
 Delia Dabwido
 Ivy Rose Jones
 Giovika Benedicta Kepae
 Eibon Jerusha Mau
 Febrose Tsiode

Rugby sevens

Nauru qualified a men's team in rugby sevens (18 athletes):

Men
 Damon ADEANG
 Chamrock Agir
 Camrod Darren Botelanga
 David John Tommy Brechtefeld
 Charles Dagiaro
 Geronimo Ivan Daniel
 Bronco Deidenang
 Sherlock Denuga
 Vito Denuga
 Rassmusen Dowabobo
 Ezra Ruga Ika
 Kingstone Ika
 Cazaly Jeremiah
 Kristides Menke
 Kenneth Oppenheimer
 Zac Temaki
 Turner Peter Thoma
 Jose Uepa
 Szabroki Vandaame Deireragea

Table tennis

Nauru qualified 3 athletes in table tennis:

Men
 Obrien Itaia
 Joweida Stephen

Women
 Oxyna Gobure

Tennis

Nauru qualified 4 athletes in tennis:

Men
 Dallas Diogouw Addi
 Bill Capelle
 Victor Moses
 Anderson-Tough Notte

Volleyball

Nauru qualified  men's and women's teams in volleyball (23 players):

Men
 Dogurube Dabwido
 Silas Dame
 Junior Faatiga
 Francis Gadeouwa
 Atto Karl
 Cherokee Moses
 Fallon Natano
 Andre Notte
 Micheal Tiki-Tembo Notte
 Rujero Reweru
 Rulando Reweru
 Geofferson Tiana Waidubu
 James Brendan Waidubu

Women
 Fimay Apad
 Bliss Dabuae
 Senora Dageago
 Gloris Eidina Grundler
 Casurina Kam
 Jackisa Mau
 Annett Muasau
 Equed Tagamoun
 Melusa Tannang
 Vianka Temaki

Weightlifting

Nauru qualified 19 athletes in weightlifting:

Men
 Elson Edward Brechtefeld
 Isaiah Quanmo Cain
 Quamen Ezekiel Cain
 Shadrach Quinton Cain
 Bronco Deiranauw
 Itte Detenamo
 Larko Doguape
 Petrillo Menke
 Chris Rangdimi
 Tango Mark Taleka
 Tom-Jaye Waibeiya

Women
 Atniza Eidabug Batsiua
 Marcincy Cook
 Ricci Pheaulika Daniel
 Uea Detudamo
 Female Grundler
 Narma Thoma
 Bernada Uepa
 Maximina Uepa

References

2015 in Nauruan sport
Nations at the 2015 Pacific Games
Nauru at the Pacific Games